The 21st Beijing College Student Film Festival took place in Beijing, China in May 2014. Director Cao Baoping's Einstein and Einstein received the Best Film Award, while Diao Yi'nan, director of Black Coal, Thin Ice was crowned with the Best Director title. Nick Cheung clinched the Best Actor title for his role in Unbeatable. The Best Actress Award went to Tang Wei, in recognition for her performance in Finding Mr. Right.

Winners and nominees

References

External links
  [List of winners of the 21st Beijing College Student Film Festival] Sina

Beijing College Student Film Festival
2014 film festivals
2014 festivals in Asia
Bei